Fernando López born 14 March 1986) is an Argentine born Spanish rugby union player that currently plays as a Prop for Tarbes in the Championnat Nationale.

Early career
Fernando López began playing rugby at the age of 12 for his home-town team Rugby Club San Marcos in San Marcos. His passion for rugby as well as his skills at Prop would eventually earn Fernando López a contract with Club Pucará, a professional team in the Argentine Top 12, 10 years after he started playing the sport.

Professional career
In 2009, Fernando López would start playing professionally for Club Pucará, but it wasn`t until 2011, when he became a non-negotiable starter for his team and would impress the eyes of many teams which had him on their radar, and upon 2014, Massy signed Fernando López on a two year contract with the then Pro D2 side. In January 2015, the Spanish national rugby union team would call him up since he was eligible to play for Spain due to his Spanish roots, and would later become the captain of his adopted country. One year in his international career, López signed with Ordizia in the División de Honor  to be closer to his national team Spain. Late in 2020, López joined Tarbes in the Championnat Nationale. After 11 matches at Tarbes, it was announced in April of 2021 that López signed with Fédérale 1 side Berre

References

External links
 
 

1986 births
Living people
Rugby union props
Argentine rugby union players
Spanish rugby union players
Spain international rugby union players
Rugby union players from Buenos Aires
Argentine people of Spanish descent
Club Pucará players
RC Massy players
Tarbes Pyrénées Rugby players